The history projection operator (HPO) formalism is an approach to temporal quantum logic developed by Chris Isham. It deals with the logical structure of quantum mechanical propositions asserted at different points in time.

Introduction 

In standard quantum mechanics a physical system is associated with a Hilbert space .

This representation links together the lattice operations in the lattice of logical propositions and the lattice of projection operators on a Hilbert space (See quantum logic).

The HPO formalism is a natural extension of these ideas to propositions about the system that are concerned with more than one time.

History propositions

Homogeneous histories 

A homogeneous history proposition  is a sequence of single-time propositions  specified at different times . These times are called the temporal support of the history.

" at time  is true and then  at time  is true and then  and then  at time  is true"

Inhomogeneous histories 

Not all history propositions can be represented by a sequence of single-time propositions at different times. These are called inhomogeneous history propositions. An example is the proposition  OR  for two homogeneous histories .

History projection operators 

The key observation of the HPO formalism is to represent history propositions by projection operators on a history Hilbert space. This is where the name "History Projection Operator" (HPO) comes from.

For a homogeneous history  we can use the tensor product to define a projector

where  is the projection operator on  that represents the proposition  at time .

This  is a projection operator on the tensor product "history Hilbert space" 

Not all projection operators on  can be written as the sum of tensor products of the form . These other projection operators are used to represent inhomogeneous histories by applying lattice operations to homogeneous histories.

Temporal quantum logic 

Representing history propositions by projectors on the history Hilbert space naturally encodes the logical structure of history propositions. The lattice operations on the set of projection operations on the history Hilbert space  can be applied to model the lattice of logical operations on history propositions.

If two homogeneous histories  and  don't share the same temporal support they can be modified so that they do. In this way the temporal supports of  can always be joined together. We shall therefore assume that all homogeneous histories share the same temporal support.

We now present the logical operations for homogeneous history propositions  and  such that

Conjunction (AND) 

It is represented by the projection operator

Disjunction (OR) 

It is represented by the projection operator

Negation (NOT) 

The negation operation in the lattice of projection operators takes  to

where  is the identity operator on the Hilbert space. Thus the projector used to represent the proposition  (i.e. "not ") is

Example: Two-time history 

As an example, consider the negation of the two-time homogeneous history proposition . The projector to represent the proposition  is

The terms which appear in this expression:

 
 
 .

can each be interpreted as follows:
 

These three homogeneous histories, joined together with the OR operation, include all the possibilities for how the proposition " and then " can be false. We therefore see that the definition of  agrees with what the proposition  should mean.

References
 C.J. Isham, Quantum Logic and the Histories Approach to Quantum Theory, J. Math. Phys. 35 (1994) 2157-2185, arXiv:gr-qc/9308006v1

Logic
Quantum measurement